Kokofu is a town in the Ashanti Region of Ghana.

Kokofu may also refer to:

Henry Kwabena Kokofu (born 1960), Ghanaian politician

See also
 Kokufu, the capitals of the historical Provinces of Japan
 Kokufu-Tagajō Station, Tagajō, Miyagi Prefecture, Japan